Mountain Empire may refer to:

Places 
Mountain Empire, San Diego, a rural area of southeastern San Diego County, California
Mountain Empire, Appalachia, a rural area of Northeast Tennessee and Southwest Virginia

Schools 
Mountain Empire Community College, a two-year college located in Big Stone Gap, Virginia
Mountain Empire Baptist School, a former K-12 school located in Bristol, Tennessee

Other 
Mountain Empire Airport, a general aviation airport in Smyth County, Virginia
A Mountain Empire District, a high school sports conference in Southwest Virginia